The Man Who Married His Own Wife is a 1922 American drama film directed by Stuart Paton and written by George Hively. The film stars Frank Mayo, Sylvia Breamer, Marie Crisp, Howard Crampton, Francis McDonald, and Joseph W. Girard. The film was released on May 1, 1922, by Universal Film Manufacturing Company.

Cast          
Frank Mayo as Jasper Marsden
Sylvia Breamer as Elsie Haynes
Marie Crisp as Miss Muriel Blythe
Howard Crampton as Judge Lawrence
Francis McDonald as Freddie Needham
Joseph W. Girard as John Marsden (credited as Joe Girard)

References

External links

1922 films
1920s English-language films
Silent American drama films
1922 drama films
Universal Pictures films
Films directed by Stuart Paton
American silent feature films
American black-and-white films
1920s American films